The Pashiko class (パシコ) locomotives were a group of steam tender locomotives of the Chosen Government Railway (Sentetsu) with 4-6-2 wheel arrangement. The "Pashi" name came from the American naming system for steam locomotives, under which locomotives with 4-6-2 wheel arrangement were called "Pacific".

In all, Sentetsu owned 144 locomotives of all Pashi classes, of which 141 survived the war; of these, 73 went to the Korean National Railroad in South Korea and 68 to the Korean State Railway in North Korea.

Description

Sentetsu designed the Pashiko class as a successor to the Pashishi class, with the first example, パシコ1, being delivered from Sentetsu's Gyeongseong Works in October 1939, and the second following a month later. They were not only the largest of all Sentetsu passenger locomotives in size, but at  they were the heaviest of all Sentetsu locomotives of any type, and with a maximum speed of  they were the fastest as well.

Postwar
After the Liberation and partition of Korea, they were divided between North and South, but the specifics of which engine went where are unclear.

Korean National Railroad 파시5 (Pasi5) class
At least eighteen Pashiko class engines went south to the Korean National Railroad, where they became 파시5 (Pasi5) class, and they were widely used on passenger trains until at least 1967. 파시5-5 was partially streamlined and given a special livery of black with white and red trim in the mid-1950s by the US Army Transportation Corps railway crews.

Korean State Railway 바시오 (Pasio) class
The locomotives taken over by the Korean State Railway were initially designated 바시오 (Pasio) class. The total number, their service lives and subsequent fates are unknown, but they were probably retired by the end of the 1960s.

References

Locomotives of Korea
Locomotives of South Korea
Locomotives of North Korea
Railway locomotives introduced in 1939
4-6-2 locomotives
Gyeongseong Works locomotives
Kawasaki locomotives